Somatina maeandrata is a moth of the  family Geometridae. It is found in Malaysia.

References

Moths described in 1925
Scopulini